Rui Carlos Tavares Maurício (born 4 July 1985) is a Portuguese football player who plays for Pinhalnovense. He also holds Angolan citizenship.

Club career
He made his professional debut in the Segunda Liga for Atlético CP on 8 August 2015 in a game against Freamunde.

References

1985 births
Sportspeople from Almada
Portuguese sportspeople of Angolan descent
Living people
Portuguese footballers
C.D. Cova da Piedade players
Atlético Clube de Portugal players
C.R. Caála players
Girabola players
C.R.D. Libolo players
Liga Portugal 2 players
Académica Petróleos do Lobito players
C.D. Pinhalnovense players
Association football defenders